Stimboli may refer to:

 Istanbul cf. Names of Istanbul
 Argyroupoli, Rethymno, formerly Lappa, Lampa, Stimboli, or Polis.